TVA  (Televizioni Arbëria or Telearbëria) is a defunct national frequency, privately owned television station based in Tirana, Albania. Founded in 1996, Tele Arbëria was one of the first private TV stations in Tirana and quickly became a major national leading channel in Albania. In fact, it was awarded national frequency status even though it covered only 30% of Albania with an analogue signal.

During the 2000s, the channel became known for its instability and frequent change of staff and executive directors, which caused a significant drop of its audience share in the market. As a result, it shut down due to bankruptcy in 2009 and its UHF frequency was sold to TV Klan. During 2007, there was significant progress in programming and continuous improvements, leading to TVA becoming a more dynamic television channel with a wider audience. Until recently, TVA was part of the DigitALB TV package, but as of 10 July 2009 the channel in the program guide DigitALB, was replaced by the news channel A1 TV.

See also
Television in Albania

External links
Defunct official website

1996 establishments in Albania
Defunct television networks in Albania
Television channels and stations established in 1996
Mass media in Tirana